Certoparin (trade names Sandoparin, Embolex) is an antithrombotic medication. It is a low molecular weight heparin, primarily active against factor Xa.  Like other low molecular weight heparins, it is used to prevent deep venous thrombosis.

References 

Heparins